Alexander Munksgaard Nielsen (born 13 December 1997) is a Danish professional footballer who plays for Danish Superliga club AGF. He has represented Denmark at under-21 level.

A product of Midtjylland's youth academy, Munksgaard made his professional debut in July 2015. He had a brief spell on loan with Lyngby during the 2016–17 season before returning to Midtjylland. He joined AGF in 2019.

Club career
As a youth player, Munksgaard first played for Vind IF, then Vinding UIF, and finally in Vildbjerg SF, before being scouted to the Midtjyland youth academy in 2010. Munksgaard made his debut in the Danish Superliga on 24 July 2015, where he played the entire match in a 1–2 victory over SønderjyskE. On 31 August 2016, it was announced that Munksgaard signed a one-season loan deal with Lyngby Boldklub valid for the 2016–17 season. He made his league debut for Lyngby in a 1–0 win over Brøndby IF. After the end of the loan, Munksgaard returned to Midtjylland.

On 4 January 2019, Munksgaard signed with AGF on a five-year contract, reuniting him with his manager at Lyngby, David Nielsen. He made his debut for the club on 8 February in a 2–0 win over Esbjerg fB. He scored his first goal for the club on 11 November 2019 in a 4–2 win over SønderjyskE.

International career
Munksgaard has played on all Denmark youth national teams from under-16 to under-21 level, where until January 2019 he played a total of 36 youth national matches. He made his debut on the under-21 team in the friendly match against England on 20 November 2018.

Honours
Midtjylland
 Danish Superliga: 2017–18
 Danish Cup: 2018–19

AGF
 The Atlantic Cup: 2020

References

Living people
1997 births
People from Herning Municipality
Association football fullbacks
Danish men's footballers
Denmark youth international footballers
Denmark under-21 international footballers
Danish Superliga players
FC Midtjylland players
Lyngby Boldklub players
Aarhus Gymnastikforening players
Sportspeople from the Central Denmark Region